The 1987 All-Ireland Senior Club Hurling Championship final was a hurling match played at Croke Park on 17 March 1987 to determine the winners of the 1986–87 All-Ireland Senior Club Hurling Championship, the 17th season of the All-Ireland Senior Club Hurling Championship, a tournament organised by the Gaelic Athletic Association for the champion clubs of the four provinces of Ireland. The final was contested by Borris-Ileigh of Tipperary and Rathnure of Wexford, with Borris-Ileigh winning by 2-9 to 0-9. 

The All-Ireland final was a unique occasion as it was the first ever championship meeting between Borris-Ileigh and Rathnure. It remains their only championship meeting at this level. Both sides were hoping to make history by winning their first All-Ireland title.

Goals were key in this game with Borris-Ileigh netting two in the first half. Philip Kenny and Aidan Ryan's majors helped the North Tipperary club to a 2-9 to 0-9 victory. For Rathnure it was a fourth All-Ireland final defeat.

Borris-Ileigh's victory secured their first All-Ireland title. They became the 11th club to win the All-Ireland title, while they were the third Tipperary representatives to claim the ultimate prize.

Match

Details

References

1987 in hurling
All-Ireland Senior Club Hurling Championship Finals
Tipperary GAA matches
Wexford GAA matches